American Playboy: The Hugh Hefner Story is a 2017 Amazon Original Series. It stars Matt Whelan in the titular role, along with Emmett Skilton and Chelsie Preston Crayford. Several African American and African British actors were linked to the program including Kelvin Taylor. The first season was released on 7 April 2017 and comprised ten episodes.
The series is a combination of interviews, archival footage (including moments found in Hefner's vast personal collection) and cinematic re-enactments that cover the launch of the magazine as well as the next six decades of Hefner's personal life and career. While building his empire, Hefner also devoted time to defending civil rights, freedom of speech and sexual freedom.

The series was filmed in Auckland, New Zealand.

References

External links 
 
 Deadline Hollywood
 Den of Geeks
 Cosmopolitan

2017 American television series debuts
2017 American television series endings
Amazon Prime Video original programming
Television shows filmed in New Zealand
Television series by Banijay
Television series by Amazon Studios
Cultural depictions of Hugh Hefner